Scott Stewart Milanovich (born January 25, 1973) is an American football coach and former quarterback who is the quarterbacks coach for the Indianapolis Colts of the National Football League (NFL). He previously served as the head coach of the Edmonton Football Team of the Canadian Football League (CFL) in 2020, the quarterbacks coach for the Jacksonville Jaguars from 2017 to 2019 and the head coach of Toronto Argonauts from 2012 to 2016. Milanovich also served as an assistant coach for the Montreal Alouettes, Cologne Centurions and Rhein Fire.

Milanovich's playing career lasted from 1996 to 2003 as a quarterback in the NFL for the Tampa Bay Buccaneers, in NFL Europe for the Berlin Thunder, in the XFL for the Los Angeles Xtreme, in the Arena Football League for the Tampa Bay Storm, and in the CFL for the Calgary Stampeders. Milanovich played college football at Maryland.

Early life
Milanovich played high school football at Butler Senior High School in Butler, Pennsylvania.

Playing career

College
Milanovich attended the University of Maryland, where he played college football as a quarterback and punter. Milanovich played as a true freshman, backing up John Kaleo and recording 1 touchdown and 1 interception across 11 games. Milanovich started to begin his sophomore year, where he recorded 26 touchdowns and 18 interceptions, in addition to three rushing touchdowns. He also led the ACC that season in passing attempts, completions, yards, and interceptions. As a junior, Milanovich recorded 20 touchdowns to 9 interceptions, leading the NCAA that season in completion percentage (68.8), leading the ACC again in completions and for the first time in touchdowns. Prior to the 1995 season, Milanovich and four other Maryland players received suspensions for betting on college football and basketball games. Milanovich received an eight-game suspension (later reduced to four) during his senior year for having bet between $25 and $50 on a total of six games. The bets had no impact on the outcome of the games. Milanovich struggled upon his return, throwing for two touchdowns and seven interceptions, though his senior season was the only one in which Maryland had a winning record. Despite his senior struggles, Milanovich still holds several career passing records for Maryland, including attempts, completions, yards, completion percentage, and touchdowns (he is tied with Dick Shiner for career interceptions).

Milanovich was named the MVP for the Blue squad in the Blue-Gray Classic, and completed 9 of 20 pass attempts for 175 yards and two touchdowns.

College statistics

National Football League

Tampa Bay Buccaneers
After going undrafted in the 1996 NFL Draft, Milanovich signed as a free agent with the Tampa Bay Buccaneers. During his rookie campaign, he was designated as the team's third quarterback for 15 games, seeing action in one contest. In that game he completed two of three passes for nine yards. In 1997, he was declared inactive before all 16 regular season games and both playoff contests.

After being left unprotected by the Buccaneers in the 1999 NFL expansion draft, Milanovich was the only quarterback selected by the Cleveland Browns, but he never played for the team.

XFL

Los Angeles Xtreme
Milanovich was expected to be the starting quarterback for the XFL's Los Angeles Xtreme but lost the job to Tommy Maddox. Milanovich saw limited action as the Xtreme's second-string quarterback, behind Maddox. The Xtreme won the league's championship game, the Million Dollar Game in the original XFL's sole season.

Coaching career

Rhein Fire
Milanovich began his coaching career as the quarterbacks coach for the Rhein Fire of NFL Europe in the spring of 2003.

Calgary Stampeders
In 2003, Milanovich joined the Calgary Stampeders of the Canadian Football League where he was their quarterbacks coach.

Mansfield University
Between the 2004 and 2005 seasons, Milanovich was the quarterbacks coach and offensive coordinator for the now defunct Mansfield University Mountaineers football team.

Rhein Fire (second stint)
In 2004, he returned to the Rhein Fire where he served another season as quarterbacks coach. He was elevated to the position of offensive coordinator in 2005.

Cologne Centurions
In 2006, Milanovich served as the offensive coordinator for the Cologne Centurions.

Montreal Alouettes
Milanovich returned to the CFL in February 2007 when he was named quarterbacks coach of the Montreal Alouettes. A year later he was promoted to offensive coordinator. In 2009, he added the title of assistant head coach.

Toronto Argonauts
On December 1, 2011, Milanovich was named the 42nd head coach of the Toronto Argonauts. His Argonauts won the Grey Cup in his first season at the helm. Following a 9–9 regular season in 2012, Milanovich led the Toronto Argonauts to a 35–22 Grey Cup victory in his debut season as a head coach, and was named the 2012 CFL Coach of the Year.

Milanovich's second season as Argonauts head coach was a successful one. The team battled plenty of injuries yet still managed to finish first place in the Eastern Division with an 11–7 record, their first division championship since the 2007 season. The Argonauts would eventually lose in the Eastern Final playoff game to Hamilton.

Due to uncertainty over his future with the Argonauts, Milanovich resigned as the team's head coach.

Jacksonville Jaguars
On January 26, 2017, Milanovich was hired by the Jacksonville Jaguars as their quarterbacks coach under head coach Doug Marrone. In November 2018, with the Jaguars offense struggling, offensive coordinator Nathaniel Hackett was fired and Milanovich assumed play-calling duties. Following the 2018 season, Milanovich then relinquished offensive coordinator duties to the recently hired John DeFilippo.

Edmonton Eskimos/Football Team
On December 12, 2019, Milanovich was named the 22nd head coach of the Edmonton Eskimos. He remained the Jaguars' quarterbacks coach until the end of the 2019 season. He named his coaching staff on January 21, 2020, but the 2020 CFL season was eventually cancelled due to the COVID-19 pandemic. On January 25, 2021, Milanovich resigned as head coach in order to pursue NFL opportunities.

Indianapolis Colts
On January 27, 2021, Milanovich was hired by the Indianapolis Colts as their quarterbacks coach under head coach Frank Reich, replacing Marcus Brady, who was promoted to offensive coordinator.

Head coaching record

CFL

Legal troubles
Following his time in Tampa Bay he was charged with driving under the influence for an incident on April 11, 1998. He was pulled over by police in Pinellas Park, Florida, and found to have a blood alcohol content of 0.135. He pleaded no contest and received a $550 fine, probation, 50 hours of community service and six-month driver's license suspension. He was able to pay the Salvation Army in order to avoid the community service requirement.

References

External links
 Indianapolis Colts profile

1973 births
Living people
American football quarterbacks
American players of Canadian football
Berlin Thunder players
Calgary Stampeders coaches
Calgary Stampeders players
Canadian football quarterbacks
Cologne Centurions (NFL Europe) coaches
Edmonton Elks coaches
Jacksonville Jaguars coaches
Los Angeles Xtreme players
Maryland Terrapins football players
Montreal Alouettes coaches
Rhein Fire coaches
Tampa Bay Buccaneers players
Tampa Bay Storm players
Toronto Argonauts coaches
People from Butler, Pennsylvania
Players of American football from Pennsylvania
Sportspeople from the Pittsburgh metropolitan area
American people of Serbian descent
Indianapolis Colts coaches